Etches is a surname. Notable people by that name include:

 Adam Etches (born 1991), British professional boxer
 Bill Etches (1921–2015), British Army officer
 Matilda Etches (1898–1974), British fashion designer
 Steve Etches, plumber and fossil collector
 Stephen Etches, translator Bible translations into Albanian